Go Ah-sung (born August 10, 1992) is a South Korean actress. She began her career as a child actress, notably in The Host. Her other notable works include Snowpiercer (2013), Samjin Company English Class (2020), as well as the TV dramas Master of Study (2010) and Heard It Through the Grapevine (2015).

Career
Go Ah-sung was four years old when she appeared in her first commercial, and she joined the 2002 stage musical Peter Pan when she was ten. At thirteen, Go began her acting career in the KBS children's program Oolla Boolla Blue-jjang (2004).

Having worked together in the MBC omnibus drama Beating Heart (2005), actress Bae Doona recommended Go to director Bong Joon-ho when he was casting for his much-anticipated monster film. After an extensive audition process, Go made her film debut in 2006 with a starring role in The Host. Bong praised her work, saying that she "showed really mature acting for her age, and that's one of her defining charms as an actress." Go was also applauded by film critics, with Stephen Hunter of The Washington Post complimenting her "exquisite performance," and Megan Ratner of the Bright Lights Film Journal noting her "unforced naturalness, reminiscent not only of Ana Torrent but of Zazie'''s Catherine Demongeot." Go received several acting nominations, and won Best New Actress at the 2006 Blue Dragon Film Awards.

She continued her film career with supporting roles in The Happy Life (2007), Radio Dayz (2008), and A Brand New Life (2009). In 2010, Go appeared in the high school series Master of Study, a Korean drama adaptation of the Japanese manga Dragon Zakura. It scored the highest ratings in its timeslot during its run.

Go starred in her first leading role in Duet (2012), an indie romance about an aspiring Korean singer on a tour of England and the British guy she meets who shares her interests in music, photography and travel.

In 2013, she reunited with The Host costar Song Kang-ho in the blockbuster sci-fi thriller Snowpiercer, Bong Joon-ho's first English-language film. Go next appeared opposite Kim Hee-ae in Thread of Lies (2014), a film adaptation of Kim Ryeo-ryeong's novel Elegant Lies about a willful girl seeking the truth behind her sister's suicide.

Go signed with an American agency, Untitled Entertainment in 2014. She returned to television in 2015 with Heard It Through the Grapevine, a black comedy about the chaos an unplanned teenage pregnancy causes in a wealthy, powerful family. Go then headlined the mystery thriller Office, which made its world premiere in the Midnight Screenings section at Cannes; she won Best Actress at Fancine for her role as an intern who becomes a person of interest in a murder investigation.

In 2016, she featured in an episode of the Japanese television series, Midnight Diner. She then starred in war drama A Melody to Remember. The film won the audience award at the 18th Far East Film Festival.

In 2017, Go challenges her first romantic comedy in the MBC's drama Radiant Office, as a twentysomething woman who, after a suicide attempt and possible terminally-ill diagnosis, thinks she has nothing to lose and tackles her job and life with new perspectives.

In 2018, Go was cast in the South Korean adaptation of the U.K series Life on Mars, as the sole female detective of the team. In 2019, Go returned to the big screen with historical film A Resistance.

Go led the 2020 critically-acclaimed and box office success dramedy film Samjin Company English Class, the winner of Best Film at the 57th Baeksang Arts Awards. She acted as an employee who mastered daily office works but accidentally discovered the company's water pollution leakage.

In 2022, Go returned to TV series with the role of a tax investigator in the MBC and Wavve's financial thriller Tracer.

Other activities
Go enjoys traveling alone and taking pictures. She became interested in photography through friend and frequent costar Bae Doona. Go's photographs were exhibited at the 5th annual Seoul Open Art Fair in 2010, alongside artwork by Ha Jung-woo and photos by Uhm Tae-woong.

Another of her interests is music. She did her own singing for the film Duet'', and has performed live on stage at Mudaeruk in Hongdae.

Go majored in Psychology at Sungkyunkwan University.

Filmography

Film

Television series

Web series

Television shows

Discography

Singles

Awards and nominations

References

External links
Go Ah-sung at KeyEast

Living people
South Korean film actresses
South Korean television actresses
21st-century South Korean actresses
Actresses from Seoul
South Korean child actresses
Sungkyunkwan University alumni
Best New Actress Paeksang Arts Award (television) winners
1992 births